Prosper Pierre-Louis (1947–1997), was a Haitian artist, painter; and one of the main contributors to the local school of the Saint Soleil art movement. His paintings depicting mystical Vodou Loas and spirits are especially noteworthy.

Pierre-Louis was born on October 12, 1947, in Bainet, near Jacmel, Haiti. He did not have any formal schooling, but taught himself to play the drums and the violin. As a child he assisted his father, a houngan, in preparing Haitian Vodou ceremonies. At the age of 16 he moved to Port-au-Prince. There he took a number of odd jobs. Later while working as a waiter at the home of Maud Robard he joined the "Saint Soleil" peasant commune (organized by the latter) which united a variety of poor artists including singers, dancers, craftsmen, and painters into the movement. Prosper followed Maude to the community at Soisson-la-Montagne on the mountain above LaBoule and eventually became the most prominent painter in the group.

The Saint Soleil group disbanded after only a few years but five of the artists, Prosper, Levoy Exil, Denis Smith, Dieuseul Paul, and Louisiane Saint Fleurant reorganized into the group "Cinq Soleils". After years of labor Prosper's technique greatly evolved and he became a prominent and respected member of the local art community. His flourishing career came to an abrupt end when he died prematurely of an asthma attack in November 1997.

Paintings by Prospere Pierre-Louis have been sold by the Friends of HAS Haiti to raise funds for the Hôpital Albert Schweitzer Haiti, located in Deschapelles. Works by the artist are part of The Olivier Doria d'Angri collection.

External links
Some paintings at Galery d'Art Nader, PAP, Haiti.
Paintings by Pierre-Louis Prospère at Friends of Hopital Albert Schweitzer

1947 births
1997 deaths
20th-century Haitian painters
20th-century male artists
Haitian male painters